The Northern Pacific Railway class T-1 was a class of 2-6-2 steam locomotives rebuilt by the Northern Pacific Railway in the 1920s for switching and terminal service. They had originally been built between 1906 and 1907 by the American Locomotive Company's Brooks Works as the NP's class T for service on in the railway's expanding network of branch lines.

Usage
The 2-6-2 Class T-1 Was used on the Northern Pacific Railway from roughly 1926–1959. #2435 survives today.

References

External links
Steamlocomotive.com: Northern Pacific Railway locomotives

T-1
Steam locomotives of the United States
2-6-2 locomotives